James Caulfeild, 1st Earl of Charlemont KP PC (Ire) (18 August 1728 – 4 August 1799), was an Irish statesman.

Life

Early life
The son of James Caulfeild, 3rd Viscount Charlemont, he was born in Dublin, and succeeded his father as 4th Viscount in 1734. His mother was Elizabeth Bernard, daughter of Francis Bernard, MP and judge of the Court of Common Pleas (Ireland) and Alice Ludlow. After his father's death, she remarried Thomas Adderley, and died in childbirth in 1743 at the age of 40, after the birth of her daughter Elizabeth, who later married Major David Ross.

The title of Charlemont descended from Sir Toby Caulfeild (1565–1627) of Oxfordshire, England, who was given lands in Ireland, and created Baron Charlemont (the name of a fort on the Blackwater), for his services to King James I in 1620. The 1st Viscount was the 5th Baron (d. 1671), who was advanced in the peerage by Charles II.

Art and culture
Lord Charlemont was well known for his love of Classical art and culture and spent nine years on the Grand Tour in Italy, Greece, Turkey and Egypt. He returned to Dublin and employed the Scottish architect Sir William Chambers to remodel his main residence Marino House and the unique Neo-Classical garden pavilion building adjacent, the Casino at Marino, as well as to design his townhouse Charlemont House.

His former townhouse at 14 Jervis Street was gifted to the then fledgling Jervis Street Hospital and opened in 1796.

Politics
Lord Charlemont is historically interesting for his political connection with Henry Flood and Henry Grattan; he was a cultivated man with literary and artistic tastes, and both in Dublin and in London he had considerable social influence. He was the first President of the Royal Irish Academy and was a member of the Royal Dublin Society. He was appointed Custos Rotulorum of County Armagh for life in 1760. For various early services in Ireland, he was made an earl in 1763, but he disregarded court favours and cordially joined Grattan in 1780 in the assertion of Irish independence. In 1783 he was made a founding Knight of the Order of St Patrick.

He was president of the volunteer convention in Dublin in November 1783, having taken a leading part in the formation of the Irish Volunteers; and he was a strong opponent of the proposals for the Union. His eldest son, who succeeded him, was subsequently (1837) created an English Baron.

Personal life
In 1768 Charlemont married Mary Hickman, daughter of Thomas Hickman of Brickhill, County Clare. The marriage is said to have been a very happy one. They had two sons, James and Henry.

His half-sister, Elizabeth Adderley (born 23 May 1743), was the mother of Major-General Robert Ross.

The somewhat inaccurate Memoirs of the Political and Private Life of James Caulfield, Earl of Charlemont, Knight of St. Patrick, by Francis Hardy, appeared in 1810.

References

1728 births
1799 deaths
18th-century Irish people
James
Caulfeild, James
Earls in the Peerage of Ireland
Knights of St Patrick
Members of the Privy Council of Ireland
Fellows of the Royal Society
Viscounts Charlemont
Presidents of the Royal Irish Academy